Philippe Demers (April 28, 1919 – March 4, 1999) was a veterinarian and a politician in Quebec, Canada.  He served as member of the Legislative Assembly of Quebec.

Early life and career

He was born in 1919 in Saint-Sébastien, Montérégie.  He practiced as a veterinarian in Shawinigan-Sud, Mauricie.

Municipal politics

He served as city councillor from 1953 to 1957 and as mayor of Shawinigan-Sud from 1957 to 1962.

Provincial politics

He successfully ran as the Union Nationale candidate in the provincial district of Saint-Maurice in the 1966 general election  to the Legislative Assembly of Quebec, defeating the liberal incumbent Jean-Guy Trépanier.  Demers was re-elected to the National Assembly of Quebec in the 1970 general election.

In 1973, Demers lost re-election against the liberal candidate Marcel Bérard, finishing a close third behind Bérard and Parti Québécois candidate Yves Duhaime.

Federal politics

Demers ran as a Progressive Conservative candidate in the district of Champlain in 1980.  He finished third, behind Liberal incumbent Michel Veillette and NDP candidate René Matte.

After retirement from politics

He died in Charlesbourg in 1999.

References

1919 births
1999 deaths
Mayors of places in Quebec
Union Nationale (Quebec) MNAs
Canadian veterinarians
Male veterinarians
Progressive Conservative Party of Canada candidates for the Canadian House of Commons
Candidates in the 1980 Canadian federal election